The Pima County Public Library (PCPL) system serves Pima County, Arizona, with a main library and 26 branch libraries as well as bookmobile service. The system has its headquarters in Tucson. The service area includes the city of Tucson and the surrounding communities of Arivaca, Green Valley, Sahuarita, South Tucson, Ajo, Vail, Marana, Casas Adobes, and Catalina. The town of Oro Valley's library joined the Pima County Public Library system in July 2012.

Early History
On July 8, 2014, in the Arizona Daily Star newspaper, historian David Leighton published news of his rediscovery of the first known public library in Tucson. The 1867 Territorial Library, created by the territorial government for the 10 years that Tucson was the capital of the Arizona Territory, 1867-1877. How large was it? In January 1877, the Territorial Library had 1,900 legal books and 300 non-legal volumes, which could be checked out by the public during regular hours.

In 1879, a group of women in Tucson began the Tucson Library Association, which was a private organization where members paid a subscription fee to help buy the books that they could borrow. Subscription libraries were popular in the west during this time, but excluded people who could not pay the fees. In March 1883, The women of the Tucson Library Association offered to give their whole private collection to the City of Tucson, if the city council would provide a room and other needed items for a free library. 

On June 5, 1883, the city council dedicated the second floor of the new city hall for the purpose of a library, but didn't set aside any money to buy things like book shelves and furniture. It was not until July 6, 1886, after money was raised for the needed items, that the Tucson Public Library first opened its doors. The public library was in the original City Hall (building that also housed local prisoners.

In 1899, philanthropist Andrew Carnegie offered $25,000 to build a public library building in Tucson, if the city council would set aside land and guarantee a fund of $2,000 a year for its upkeep. The city council passed Resolution #20 in 1899, which provided land that was part of the Military Plaza for the site and set up the Library Fund. The new Carnegie Free Library opened in 1901.

In 1901 in response to a contest, the City of Tucson was gifted $25,000 by Andrew Carnegie to build the iconic Carnegie Public Library (1901 - 1934).  It was designed by Henry C. Trost. Carnegie committed to paying up to $25,000 to build a new library on the condition that the City of Tucson supplied a building site and provided $2,000 per year to maintain the library. The Tucson Common Council made good on this deal by passing Resolution Number 20. This resolution earmarked $2,000 per year for library maintenance, and designated a site for the library. The site used constituted a portion of Military Plaza.  

Today, the building is the Children's Museum Tucson.

Public library name changes
1883-1901: Library Hall

1901-1957: Carnegie Free Library

1957-1990: Tucson Public Library (TPL), a change made by Tucson City Council.

1990-2006: Tucson-Pima Public Library (TPPL), reflecting a new funding structure, the result of an agreement between the City of Tucson and Pima County to share library expenses 50-50.

2006-present: Pima County Public Library (PCPL). As of July 1, 2006, the library system is wholly funded and governed by the Pima County and its Board of Supervisors. It is still headquartered in Tucson, AZ.

Services 

As of March 18, 2020, Library services have been adjusting frequently to prevent the spread of COVID-19. Please visit the library website for an up-to-date list of the services we can offer.

The PCPL system offers a variety of services for both children and adults. For children, storytimes are offered, including bilingual storytimes at some library locations. Children can improve their reading skills through our Read to a Dog program. Assistance with homework is also available online, by phone, and at specific library locations. Additional children's activities include El Dia de los Ninos/El Dia de los Libros, and the summer reading program.

PCPL also provides information on clubs, events, and opportunities available to teens. At PCPL, teens can serve as library advocates, participate on an advisory board, and volunteer. Teen programs include "MegaMania!!," an annual fandom con, programming classes, gaming, and drawing and poetry contests.

For adults, a wide range of services are available. Libraries host book clubs, computer classes, author visits, English classes, citizenship classes, and assistance looking and applying for jobs.

PCPL provides a wide range of services for the community. Their events are posted on the calendar. Further information is also available on their website.

In 2012 PCPL became the first library in the nation to employ a public health nurse on site. A Public Health Nurse from the Pima County Health Department offers on-site expert medical help to assist library customers who turn to the library for help and safety and directs them to social services when appropriate. 

New regulations during a pandemic

Due to the COVID-19 pandemic, libraries are offering limited services. 

The following provides precautions during the pandemic and the opening hours of the library. For more information, please visit the Pima County Public Library website.

Please do not enter the library if you are sick or have a fever. Visitors must continue to observe COVID-19 mitigation behaviors:

 Wear masks at all times inside libraries.

 No eating or drinking inside the library because masks cannot be removed.

 Maintain physical distancing from others.

 Wash hands frequently.

Controversies 
In 2012, the Tucson Unit of the National Writers Union (NWU) publicly raised objections to the library's collection development policy. In an op-ed piece published in the Tucson Weekly's July 5 edition ("The Pima County Public Library Must Stop Getting Rid of Our Books"), the NWU pointed out that PCPL ranks 28th, next to last, in the number of printed materials per resident in public libraries serving comparable populations, despite that in the same Institute of Museum and Library Services survey the library ranked sixteenth in the amount of money it spent on printed materials per resident. Because it discards books so aggressively, the op-ed piece continued, the library has a sub-par collection of books even though it spends enough money to have a much better quality collection.

In its reply to the piece, the PCPL stated that its collection development policy is geared toward "making room on the shelves for high-demand and popular books and materials in other formats" and pointed out that library circulation had increased from 6.2 million items in 2006 to more than 7.5 million items in 2010. It also stated that readers have the possibility of getting books they want via inter-library loan services or by requesting that the library order the book.

In 2014, KVOA News did two special reports on the library. The first of these highlighted how the library was forced to supplement its standard security service with off-duty officers from the Tucson Police Department. This was done to provide additional security at three of the library branches in which an unusually high number of incidents, ranging from fights to domestic disputes, had taken place.

The second KVOA News report focused on how "hundreds of thousands of dollars in inventory is going missing from the libraries and nobody seems to know why," and how the library, though spending 750,000 dollars a year on security, is not particularly focused on securing or protecting the books, DVDs and CDs in its collection.

Timeline

Library directors

Libraries 
 Joel D. Valdez Main Library
 Caviglia-Arivaca Library
 Dewhirst-Catalina Library
 Dusenberry-River Library
 Eckstrom-Columbus Library
 El Rio Library
 Flowing Wells Library
Frank De La Cruz-El Pueblo Library
 Himmel Library
 Joyner-Green Valley Library
 Kirk-Bear Canyon Library
 Martha Cooper Library
 Miller-Golf Links Library
 Murphy-Wilmot Library
 Nanini Library (Casas Adobes, unincorporated area)
 Oro Valley Public Library
 Quincie Douglas Library
Richard Elías-Mission Library
 Sahuarita Library
 Salazar-Ajo Library
 Sam Lena-South Tucson Library
 Santa Rosa Library
 Southwest Library
 Valencia Library
W. Anne Gibson-Esmond Station Library
 Wheeler Taft Abbett, Sr. Library
 Woods Memorial Library
Permanently closed: Geasa-Marana Library (This location closed permanently on 1/27/17)

References

Sources 
 "History," "Timeline" and "Library Directors." Pima County Public Library website, 12-5-2012
 "City library director plans to resign, cites burnout." Arizona Daily Star. June 19, 1991
 "Councilmen rechristen the library."  Arizona Daily Star. January 8, 1957. Page B1 and Staff notes.
 "County settle two lawsuits, buys flood-damaged home." Arizona Daily Star. November 15, 2006.
  David Leighton, "Street Smarts: Books a hot commodity in early Tucson," Arizona Daily Star, July 8, 2014

External links 

  Pima County Public Library
  Library Locations & Hours
 David Leighton, "Street Smarts: Books a hot commodity in early Tucson," Arizona Daily Star, July 8, 2014

Public libraries in Arizona
Education in Pima County, Arizona
Buildings and structures in Pima County, Arizona